CFZM is a Class A clear-channel radio station, licensed in Toronto, Ontario, Canada, broadcasting on the assigned frequency of 740 kHz, and with a low power repeater in downtown Toronto at 96.7 FM. The station airs an oldies format branded as Zoomer Radio, with the slogan "The Original Greatest Hits". Its studios are located in the Liberty Village neighbourhood, while its transmitter is located in Hornby.

History
The station was originally launched in 1956 on 1250 AM in Oakville, with the call sign CHWO, by Prime Time Radio, a company owned by broadcaster Howard Caine and a number of minority investors. In 1967, shortly before Caine's death, his wife Jean was appointed to the board of directors and took over the station's management.
In 1974, CHWO added a sister station, CJMR in Mississauga which was not included in the 2008 sale of CHWO.

In 2000, the Canadian Broadcasting Corporation's CBL gave up its longtime home on 740 and moved to FM. CBL had long been plagued by radio frequency interference that made it virtually unlistenable in downtown Toronto. Despite this shortfall, the prized clear channel frequency became hotly contested by new and existing stations in the area. CHWO applied for the frequency, citing that it could provide a stronger service to the region's older adult population. Concurrently, the Caine family also applied for a new station on the old 1250 frequency, to air a Christian music format. The applications were granted, and CHWO moved to the 740 frequency on January 8, 2001, leasing CBL's former transmitter in Hornby from the CBC. CHWO originally applied for the new call sign CFPT, but when this was denied by Industry Canada because the call sign was already in use, the station chose to retain its heritage "CHWO" calls. CHWO's replacement at 1250, CJYE, launched on February 5.

On September 18, 2007, Prime Time Radio announced a deal to sell the station to Moses Znaimer, under whom it would become a sister station to Toronto's classical music station, CFMZ. The deal was approved by the CRTC on March 31, 2008. Znaimer also moved the station's studios and city of licence to Toronto, and changed the station's call sign to CFZM on July 22, 2008.

A complete list of programs with descriptions can be found on the shows page of the website.

The station was originally owned by Znaimer's privately held MZ Media Inc. As part of a reorganization of Znaimer's media assets, the station was transferred to the publicly traded ZoomerMedia in 2010.

In 2012, Zoomer Media was one of 27 applicants for an FM station at 88.1 MHz, for the purpose of simulcasting CFZM in the city of Toronto itself. The bid was unsuccessful and the CRTC awarded the frequency to CIND-FM.

On April 27, 2015, MZ Media received CRTC approval to operate a nested FM transmitter in downtown Toronto to rebroadcast CFZM at 96.7 MHz with an average effective radiated power (ERP) of 22.4 watts (maximum ERP of 82 watts with an effective height of antenna above average terrain of 280.1 metres), with transmitting facilities located atop First Canadian Place. The repeater (CFZM-1-FM) would enable CFZM to overcome the deficiencies of the AM signal in the downtown core—the same problems that led CBL to leave the AM band 15 years earlier. The repeater, however, will be a first-adjacent signal to CKHC-FM 96.9, a college radio station at Humber College that serves an area in the northwestern part of the city, and will also face co-channel interference with CHYM in Kitchener and CJWV in Peterborough. The repeater would sign on that July.

References

External links
 Zoomer Radio
 
 
 
 CFZM on Radio-Locator

Fzm
Fzm
Fzm
Radio stations established in 1956
1956 establishments in Ontario
Clear-channel radio stations